Eunice Barber (born November 17, 1974 in Freetown, Sierra Leone) is a Sierra Leonean athlete competing in heptathlon and long jump. Barber initially competed for Sierra Leone and then for France from 1999 onwards. She won the heptathlon at the World Athletics Championships in 1999, the long jump in 2003 and finished second in heptathlon in 2003 and 2005.

Debut
Barber participated in the 1992 Olympic Games in Barcelona in the heptathlon and 100 m hurdles. She also participated in the heptathlon at the 1993 World Championships in Stuttgart, but failed to finish.

Breakthrough
At the 1995 World Championships in Gothenburg, she beat her personal bests in six (out of seven) events in the heptathlon and finished in fourth place. The same year, she won the gold medal in long jump at the All-Africa Games in Harare. The next year, she finished fifth in the heptathlon at the 1996 Olympic Games in Atlanta. In those games, she also participated in the long jump (but did not qualify for the final).

Duels with Denise Lewis
Because of an injury, Eunice Barber could not compete in 1998. In February 1999, she became a French citizen (she has trained and lived in France since 1992).

In the 1999 World Championships heptathlon in Seville, she beat Denise Lewis by just 137 points with a personal best total of 6861 points with Lewis safely in second by a further 224 points to third placed Ghada Shouaa.

In 2000, Eunice Barber recorded the year's best score of 6842 points. However, during the Olympic Games in Sydney, an injury forces her to withdraw from the competition after five events. Denise Lewis wins the heptathlon.

Duels with Carolina Klüft
At the 2003 World Championships in Paris, Carolina Klüft captured her first world title, in front of Barber's adopted home crowd. Klüft finished with 7001 points, ahead of Barber, with 6755 points. However, Barber bounced back to win the long jump, with her last-round attempt.

At the 2005 World Championships in Athletics in Helsinki, Klüft and Barber battle again for the Gold Medal. Once again Klüft wins (with 6,887 points) and Barber takes the second place (with 6,824 points). Barber failed to defend her long jump crown, but took a bronze in the event.

At the 2006 European Championships in Athletics in Gothenburg, Barber hoped to even the score with Klüft, by beating her in front of her home crowd. However, Barber was forced to withdraw on day one because of a hip injury.

Police scuffle
In March 2006, Eunice was involved in an altercation near the Stade de France in which Eunice claimed she was aggressively handled by a group of police officers following a minor traffic offense.

References

External links
  Official website of Eunice Barber
 

1974 births
Living people
Sportspeople from Freetown
French female long jumpers
French heptathletes
Sierra Leonean long jumpers
Sierra Leone Creole people
Athletes (track and field) at the 1992 Summer Olympics
Athletes (track and field) at the 1996 Summer Olympics
Athletes (track and field) at the 2000 Summer Olympics
Athletes (track and field) at the 2004 Summer Olympics
Olympic athletes of France
Olympic athletes of Sierra Leone
World Athletics Championships medalists
Sierra Leonean female athletes
African Games gold medalists for Sierra Leone
African Games medalists in athletics (track and field)
Athletes (track and field) at the 1995 All-Africa Games
World Athletics Championships winners